Christiane Brunner (b. Geneva, 23 March 1947) is a Swiss politician and lawyer.

Career
Brunner has occupied the following positions:
Deputy of the Great Council of the Canton of Geneva, 1981–1990
Member of the National Council, 1991–1995
Member of the Council of States, 1995–2007
President of the Swiss Socialist Party, 2000–2004

1993 election
Brunner was the official candidate of the Socialist Party when René Felber retired from the Federal Council in 1993.  On 3 March 1993 the Federal Assembly elected Francis Matthey, however he forfeited this position due to the opposition of his own party. On 10 March 1993 Ruth Dreifuss was elected to the Federal Council over Christiane Brunner.

Positions
Brunner is very active in affairs dealing with trade unions (she is the president of the FTMH union), and was a member of Parliament who became very engaged when topics such as Social Security and labor laws were discussed.

She is currently the president of the Committee for Social Security and Public Health in the Council of States (CSSS-CE).

External links

1947 births
20th-century Swiss lawyers
20th-century Swiss women politicians
20th-century Swiss politicians
21st-century Swiss lawyers
21st-century Swiss women politicians
21st-century Swiss politicians
Living people
Members of the Council of States (Switzerland)
Members of the National Council (Switzerland)
Politicians from Geneva
Social Democratic Party of Switzerland politicians
Swiss trade unionists
Swiss women lawyers
Women members of the Council of States (Switzerland)
Women members of the National Council (Switzerland)
20th-century women lawyers
21st-century women lawyers